Makurdi Airport  is an airport serving Makurdi, the capital city of Benue State in Nigeria.

The runway has an additional  paved overrun on each end.

See also

Transport in Nigeria
List of airports in Nigeria

References

External links
OurAirports - Makurdi
OpenStreetMap - Makurdi
SkyVector Aeronautical Charts

Airports in Nigeria
Benue State